Johannes A. Jehle (born 1961, Illertissen, Germany) is a German scientist for insect virology, and plant protection. The focus of his research is the use of microorganisms and viruses for biological control of insect pests and the development of sustainable methods for plant protection. He heads the Institute for Biological Plant Control of the Julius Kühn-Institut in Darmstadt and is an adjunct Professor at the Technical University Darmstadt.  He was President of the Society of Invertebrate Pathology in 2016/2018.

Education
Jehle attended secondary school Kolleg der Schulbrueder in Illertissen, from where he graduated in 1980. After studying biology at universities in Ludwig Maximilian University of Munich and Goettingen University with an emphasis on botany, phytopathology, and statistics he undertook a six-month field study on indigenous medicinal plants and healing methods in West Africa. From 1989 to 1993, he completed postgraduate studies in plant protection at Goettingen University and worked on his thesis "Safety Aspects of geneic Engineering: the Relationships and Variability of the Genomes of Cryptophlebia leucotrata granulovirus and des Cydia pomonella granulovirus" at the Centre for Agriculture and Forestry in Braunschweig. He obtained the doctoral degree Dr. rer. nat. in 1994 from the Technical University of Braunschweig.

Research
From 1994 to 1996 he was Marie-Curie Fellow at the Department of Virology of Wageningen University (the Netherlands) working with Prof. J. M. Vlak, before he moved to the plant protection service of the state of Rhineland-Palatinate. From 1997 to 2009 he headed the research group Biotechnological Plant Protection at the Agricultural Service Centre in Neustadt an der Weinstrasse, where he addressed safety issues related to genetic engineering of maize and grapes and improved methods for biological plant protection using microorganisms and insect viruses. Since 2010 he is director of the Institute for Biological Control of the Julius Kuehn Institute in Darmstadt. In 2006, he obtained a postdoctoral degree (Dr. habil.) of Genetics at the University of Mainz, and since 2012 he is adjunct Professor at the TU Darmstadt.

Jehle‘s scientific work aims  to investigate, develop, and evaluate methods of biological control for organic and integrated farming. His research focus is on insect viruses, their classification and phylogeny, their use as biological plant protection agents, and research into baculovirus resistance. In 2008 he was honored for this work by the Society of Invertebrate Pathology with the Founders´ Lecturer Award. The results of this research culminated in over 200 scientific papers and book contributions.

Publications (selection)

References

External links
 Webseite of Julius Kühn-Instituts Darmstadt
 

Living people
1961 births
21st-century German biologists
German virologists
University of Göttingen alumni
Ludwig Maximilian University of Munich alumni